Birlik (Bırlık) is a village (selo) in Talgar District of Almaty Region of south-eastern Kazakhstan.

Geography
It is located several kilometres to the west of the district's administrative centre Talgar and several kilometres southeast of the former capital of Kazakhstan, Almaty. It is directly accessed via a road from Almaty to Talgar. The main road leads west and then forks off to the northwest, joining the A351 highway which leads to the Turksib District in the eastern suburbs of Almaty and the airport. To the south of the village, across the main road, the area is mountainous and climbs dramatically from the approximate elevation of 900 metres in Birlik village.

In 1987, the village was a part of Belbulaksy Selsoviet when the country was part of the Soviet Union.

Economy
Industrial factories are located to the north of the village. Given its proximity to Almaty and excellent international connections through the airport, very close to Birlik, Birlik is a developing settlement. In recent years there has been interest from investors, including an Indian firm looking to develop beer factory production facilities in Birlik.

In July 2003 it was reported that a Social Youth Service Centre was likely to open in Birlik as part of a scheme with Almaty Region to improve youth development. A conference was held in which the  Almaty Youth Association presented a plan for developments in the Almaty area to tackle problems of youth unemployment and drug abuse.

Biology
Botanical studies were conducted in the Birlik area in August 1999. Calligonum turbineum (C4) seeds were collected from near Birlik and examined.

References

Notes

Sources
Исполком Алма-Атинского областного Совета народных депутатов. "Алма-Атинская область. Административно-территориальное деление".  Алма-Ата, "Казахстан", 1987.

Populated places in Almaty Region